, initially defined , is a series of action-adventure hack and slash video games originally developed by Tamsoft for D3 Publisher's Simple 2000 series. The series centers around Aya, a cowgirl who wears a scarf and wields a katana, who is pitted against hordes of zombies and other monsters.

Gameplay

Players guide their characters through the stages, completing tasks while fighting through enemies. The player-character's weapon becomes progressively covered in blood, causing their attacks to be slower and to inflict less damage, even getting stuck in enemies if it gets too bad. This is represented by a "Blood Meter" showing how dirty the weapon is. To prevent this, players must actively clean off their sword to keep the blood meter from filling up.

In addition, there is also the "Blood Lust" meter. As a character kills enemies, this meter starts to fill. Once the meter is full, the character will go into a "blood frenzy". This gives the character an increase in attack power, but drains health. To recover from a blood frenzy, the player must use statue items, which are dropped by dead enemies. Additionally each level will contain a large statue. Going to the large statue will remove the blood frenzy and also recover any lost health.

Games

Main series

Updated versions

Spin-offs

Other media
Aya, the series' main character, has also appeared in Simple 2000 Series Vol. 91: The All*Star Kakutou Matsuri (released as All-Star Fighters in Europe in March 2007), a fighting game featuring characters from many different Simple 2000 series releases.

References

External links

Official website

Crowd-combat fighting games
Action-adventure games
Hack and slash games
OneChanbara
Simple 2000 games
Video games featuring female protagonists
Video game franchises
Video games about zombies
Video game franchises introduced in 2004
Hack and slash video games by series